Jody Lee Latham (born 9 January 1983) is an English actor, best known for portraying the roles of Lip Gallagher in the British Channel 4 comedy-drama series Shameless, Calum McKenzie in the ITV drama series The Fixer and Rob Grayson in the BBC One soap opera EastEnders Liam Clarke in Coronation Street and Hollyoaks as Shane. He has also had notable short-term guest roles in the school-based drama series Waterloo Road and the medical drama Holby City.

Early life
Latham attended Walton High School in Nelson though was expelled. Growing up, Latham attended Burnley Youth Theatre, where he was noticed at age 12, which resulted in his acting career taking off.

He experienced a difficult childhood,  having witnessed his mother being physically abused by a former boyfriend, though subsequently found stability when his mother began a relationship with his future stepfather, whom he refers to as his "dad".

Career

1998–2007: Shameless, The Street and Ruby Blue
In 1998, Latham made his television debut in an episode of The Cops as Grant, and went on to appear, in 2000, as Nelson Catchpole in the series Big Meg, Little Meg. He played Lee, one of the key characters in When I Was 12 in 2001. Latham has appeared in five BAFTA winning dramas: Clocking Off, The Cops, The Street, Shameless and EastEnders.

Latham played a leading role in the BBC drama Mr Harvey Lights a Candle, which was shown in March 2005. He also appeared in an episode of The Street, written by Jimmy McGovern, in April 2006.

Latham worked regularly in television before being cast as Lip Gallagher in Shameless, the second eldest of the Gallagher children. Lip is an intelligent and outspoken youth who is trying to escape from the Chatsworth estate in Stretford. He was 24 when he left the show. He took on other work between series, until he was written out of the show in 2008 to allow him to concentrate on other projects. He later returned to the role for the series finale in early 2013.

In 2006, Latham filmed a short film, A Neutral Corner, about a young boxer arriving in a desolate town where he meets a dog, a stranger and a mysterious waitress. In 2007 he appeared in Ruby Blue with Bob Hoskins—Latham's first film role.

2008–2013: The Fixer, The Tudors and Hell's Kitchen
In 2008, Latham starred in  ITV1's The Fixer, playing the cheeky scally character Calum, and played a part in the music video Moonshine & Roses by International One. He also appeared in Tulisa's 2012 music video for song "Sight of You".

Latham has also turned presenter - hosting the NME Awards aftershow party interviewing award winners. He also been the face and voice of numerous brands including Clearasil, Orange Mobile, Gio Goi and many more, including the BBC flagship station Radio 1.

He appears in the films Act of Grace (which he is also associate producer) and The Michael Gomez Story (2007). In the latter he plays Michael Gomez, an Irish Traveller who turned professional boxer at 17.

Latham played guest lead in the drama The Tudors along with Jonathan Rhys Meyers.

Latham was one of the celebrities to take part in the 2009 series of Hell's Kitchen on ITV1.

In 2010, Latham played Matt on the radio series House on Fire which aired on BBC Radio 4 from 2010 to 2013.

In 2011, Latham joined the cast of the BBC soap opera EastEnders, playing Rob Grayson, a pimp in a controversial sex exploitation storyline.

In 2013, Latham appeared in the popular BBC school-based drama series, Waterloo Road as Steve-O Malone.

2015–present: Epitique
In 2015, Latham set up his own company, Epitique, which sold botox and dermal fillers, with Latham training to be able to administer the product.

Personal life
Latham has two children, a son and a daughter.

Filmography

References

External links
 
 2005 Scotsman article

1983 births
Living people
English male child actors
English male television actors
English male film actors
English male soap opera actors
People from Burnley
Male actors from Manchester
People educated at Walton High School, Nelson
20th-century English male actors
21st-century English male actors